Fine Inisi (born 19 May 1998) is a Tongan rugby union player who plays for  in Super Rugby. His playing position is centre. He was named in the Moana Pasifika squad for the 2022 Super Rugby Pacific season. He also represented  in the 2021 Bunnings NPC. Inisi is a Tongan international, having made his debut in 2021 against New Zealand, having previously represented Tonga at rugby sevens.

References

External links
itsrugby.co.uk profile

1998 births
Tongan rugby union players
Tonga international rugby union players
Living people
Rugby union centres
North Harbour rugby union players
Moana Pasifika players